Prak Sovannara is a former manager of the Cambodia national football team. He was reappointed the national coach in December 2012. Sovannara previously managed the national team from 2008 to 2009. He was the coach of Boeung Ket Angkor from 2015 until 2017, the club parted company with him by Mutual consent.

References

Living people
Cambodian footballers
Cambodia international footballers
Cambodia national football team managers
Cambodian football managers
1972 births

Association footballers not categorized by position
Nagaworld FC managers